Steve Hall is a Republican and former member of the Tennessee House of Representatives for the 18th district, encompassing Knoxville and part of Knox County.

Biography
Steve Hall was born on March 12, 1956. He received an associate degree from Pellissippi State Community College. He has also studied at the University of Tennessee.

He is the President and owner of the Interior Finishes Corporation, a contracting business. From 2001 to 2009, he served on the city council of Knoxville. He is the Chairman of the Knoxville Beer Board, and a past Board Member of the Community Television. He is a member of the Tennessee Right to Life, the National Rifle Association, the Tennessee Conservative Union, and the Knoxville Tea Party.

He is married, with five children. He is a Baptist.

References

Living people
1956 births
Republican Party members of the Tennessee House of Representatives
Politicians from Knoxville, Tennessee
Pellissippi State Community College alumni